Koçi Bey (died 1650) was a high-ranking Ottoman bureaucrat who lived in the first half of the 17th century.

Biography
He was an ethnic Albanian, born in Korçë in eastern Albania. Within the scope of the devshirme system, he studied in the Enderun (palace school) in Istanbul. He was assigned to various posts and became the consultant of two sultans, Murad IV (1623–1640) and Ibrahim (1640–1648). He prepared a series of reports (Risale) about reforms in the empire. He presented his first report to Murad IV in 1631, and the second to Ibrahim in 1640. Although the literary style of the first was more elaborate than the second, the main points were the same. In his reports he emphasized that the cause of unrest in the empire was the corruption of the timar (fief) system. He  suggested a smaller and more disciplined army and a more authoritarian leadership.

Towards the end of Ibrahim's reign he retired and returned to Korçë, his home town for the rest of his life. He was buried in Plamet village.

References

1650 deaths
People from Korçë
17th-century people from the Ottoman Empire
Year of birth unknown